Edward Fairly Stuart Graham Cloete (23 July 1897 – 19 March 1976) was a South African novelist, essayist, biographer and short story writer.

Early life 

Cloete was born in Paris to Margaret Edit Park, granddaughter of Glasgow banker Edward Fairley, and Lawrence Woodbine Cloete from South Africa, whose grandfather Henry Cloete had been Special Commissioner in the Colony of Natal. He was educated in England at Lancing College, a school which at present gives out a yearly prize in his honour to a student who excels in literature and creative writing. At Lancing he joined the Officers Training Corps and at the age of seventeen took the Sandhurst entrance exam. From there he was commissioned as a Second-Lieutenant (at the beginning of the First World War in 1914) into the Ninth King's Own Yorkshire Light Infantry, before later transferring to the Coldstream Guards. He was wounded in August 1916 and three days later arrived in London to be nursed at King Edward VII's Hospital Sister Agnes, at 9 Grosvenor Gardens, before convalescing in Hove, Sussex.

Writing career
He published his first novel, Turning Wheels, in 1937: it became a best-seller, selling more than two million copies. Importation of the book was subsequently banned in South Africa, owing to its commentary on the Great Trek, the event in which the book is set.

Many of his 14 novels and most of his short stories are historically based fictional adventures, set against the backdrop of major African, and, in particular, South African historical events. Apart from Turning Wheels, another prominent novel, 1963's Rags of Glory, is set during the Boer war (with, according to its foreword, much of the historical information based on Rayne Kruger's Goodbye Dolly Gray.) Two of his novels were turned into movies: The Fiercest Heart (1961) is based on his 1955 novel of the same name, and Majuba, released in 1968, is based on his 1941 novel The Hill of the Doves. Film producer Albert R. Broccoli attempted to film Rags of Glory in the mid-1960s with David Lean directing, but Lean subsequently – despite his initial interest in the book which he called "very good in an awful sort of way" and its subject matter – rebuffed the offer. By 1974 Broccoli still intended to film the book.

He wrote short stories. He published at least eight volumes in his lifetime.

In addition to producing South-African related works, Cloete was among the pioneers of the by-now voluminous literary subgenre depicting the aftermath of nuclear war. His 1947 novelette The Blast is written as the diary of a survivor living in the ruins of New York (published in 6 Great Short Novels of Science Fiction, ed. Groff Conklin, 1954).

Other written genres to which he contributed included poetry (collected in a volume published in 1941, The Young Men and the Old) and biography (African Portraits, 1946).

He published the first part of his autobiography, A Victorian Son, in 1972 and the second, The Gambler, in 1973.

Stuart Cloete died on 19 March 1976, in Cape Town, South Africa.

Following Cloete's death, the copyright to his works passed to his widow. After her death in August 1993, the copyright passed to Cloete's American-South African friend Warren Wilmot Williams. Although Cloete never wished to have any children of his own, he regarded Williams as an "adopted" son. In the late 1960s Cloete was instrumental in launching the young Williams' career as a documentary film producer and media executive. After inheriting the Stuart Cloete literary estate, Warren Williams established a trust to hold the copyright to Cloete's works. The copyright is managed by the British-based company Stuart Cloete Print Holdings Ltd.

Personal life

He lived most of his adult life in the town of Hermanus, in the Western Cape.

Cloete was married twice, first to Eileen Horsman in July 1917. After their divorce c.1940, his second marriage was to Mildred Elizabeth West, known as Tiny. She outlived him and died in August 1993. Cloete had no children.

Bibliography

Novels
 
Watch for the Dawn, 1939
Yesterday is Dead, 1940
The Hill of Doves, 1941
The Young Men and the Old, 1941
Congo Song, 1943
The Curve and the Tusk, 1953
The Fiercest Heart, 1955
Mamba, 1956
The Mask, 1957
Gazella, 1958
Rags of Glory, 1963
The Abductors, 1966
How Young they Died, 1969

Short fiction
Collections
Christmas in Matabeleland, 1942
The third way, 1947
The soldiers' peaches, and other African stories, 1959
The silver trumpet, and other African stories, 1961
The looking glass, and other African stories, 1963
The thousand and one nights of Jean Macaque, 1964
The honey bird, and other African stories, 1964
The writing on the wall, and other African stories, 1968
Three white swans; and other stories, 1971
The company with the heart of gold, and other stories, 1973
More nights of Jean Macaque, 1975
Canary pie, 1976
Stories

Non-fiction

African portraits: a biography of Paul Kruger, Cecil Rhodes and Lobengula, last King of the Matabele, 1946
Against these three, 1947
The African giant: the story of a journey, 1955
Storm over Africa: a study of the Mau Mau Rebellion, its causes, effects, and implications in Africa south of the Sahara, 1956
West with the sun, 1962
South Africa: the land, its people and achievements, 1968
A Victorian son: an autobiography, 1897–1922, 1972
The gambler: an autobiography volume 2, 1920–1939, 1973

See also 
 List of nuclear holocaust fiction

References

The official site of the literary estate of Stuart Cloete
Biography on Britannica
Another Biography
IMDB entry for Fiercest Heart
IMDB entry for Majuba
Article with a copy of his obituary in the Dispatch peculiarly tagged on at the end
RE controversy|Note about the banning of Turning Wheels

External links
The official Stuart Cloete website, commissioned by Warren Wilmot Williams and launched in 2007.  It honors the life of Stuart Cloete and provides a comprehensive resource for information about Cloete's literary works.
His correspondence, memorabilia and personal library are housed at the National English Literary Museum in Grahamstown, South Africa. http://www.ru.ac.za/static/institutes/nelm//?request=nelm/ where contact details for viewing this material can be found.

1897 births
1976 deaths
20th-century short story writers
20th-century South African male writers
20th-century South African novelists
British Army personnel of World War I
British military writers
Coldstream Guards officers
Esquire (magazine) people
Graduates of the Royal Military College, Sandhurst
King's Own Yorkshire Light Infantry officers
Male biographers
People educated at Lancing College
South African autobiographers
South African biographers
South African male novelists
South African male short story writers
South African short story writers
British expatriates in France
British emigrants to South Africa